William Alan Stetz (born September 28, 1945 in Milwaukee, Wisconsin) is a former American football guard in the National Football League. He played for the Philadelphia Eagles in 1967. Stetz had previously been drafted in the thirteenth round of the 1967 NFL Draft by the New Orleans Saints. He played at the collegiate level at Boston College.

See also
List of Philadelphia Eagles players

References

1945 births
Living people
Sportspeople from Waukesha, Wisconsin
Players of American football from Milwaukee
American football offensive guards
Boston College Eagles football players
Philadelphia Eagles players